Riccardo Meggiorini (born 4 September 1985) is an Italian professional footballer who plays as a forward for an amateur side San Giovanni Lupatoto.

Club career

Early career
Meggiorini took his first steps as a footballer at age eight, in a small football team from Tarmassia, a small fraction of Isola della Scala, and at 12 he entered in the Verona youth system, where he remained for two years. He moved to Bovolone in 2000, in which he scored 46 goals in 26 games in the category of Allievi regionali. He earned a call-up to the first team the following season, scoring 13 times in 27 appearances.

Inter Milan
In the summer of 2003, Meggiorini moved, on loan, to Internazionale, who placed him in the Primavera of the Nerazzurri. At the end of the season, on 23 June 2004 the club redeemed his contract. After starting the season in the youth team, Roberto Mancini called him up into the first team for the trip to Cagliari, giving him his Serie A debut on 14 November 2004, which ended 3–3.

Spezia and Pavia
In January 2005, he left on loan to Spezia of Serie C1, along with Hernán Paolo Dellafiore. In the summer of the same year, he moved to Pavia, also in Serie C1. In January 2006, he moved to Cittadella, another Serie C1 team. He loan was extended in July 2006

Cittadella
He was bought by Cittadella in co-ownership deal in summer 2007, for €40,000, and won promotion to Serie B in June 2008.

Genoa and Bari
In June 2009 Meggiorini was involved in the signing of Diego Milito (€28 million) and Thiago Motta (€10.2 million). Which Inter paid Genoa €20 million cash and half of the registration rights of Meggiorini (tagged for €2.5 million), Robert Acquafresca (€9.5 million), half of Ivan Fatić (€200,000), Leonardo Bonucci (€3 million) and Francesco Bolzoni (€3 million). Genoa also paid another €2.5 million to Cittadella via Inter in order to fully owned the registration rights of Meggiorini.

Meggiorini was transferred to Bari on 2 July 2009 along with Bonucci, Matteo Paro (loan), Andrea Ranocchia (loan) and Giuseppe Greco (loan) in another co-ownership deal, which the 50% registration rights of Bonucci Meggiorini were valued €1.75 million and €2.75 million respectively.

On 26 June 2010, he was bought back by Genoa as the Liguria side made a higher bid than Bari in a closed tender, for €1.79 million. Four days later, Genoa was reported to have agreed with Chievo to swap Meggiorini for goalkeeper Stefano Sorrentino. However, the deal collapsed.

Bologna
On 9 July 2010, he was sold to Bologna in another co-ownership deal, for €3 million. Despite not a solid member of starting XI, he also made 3 assists, tied the team record with Diego Pérez.

Novara

The following year Genoa bought back Meggiorini again (direct swap with Federico Rodríguez) but left for another side, Serie A newcomer Novara in temporary deal, for €400,000, as the club had sold its flagship striker Pablo Andrés González and Cristian Bertani.

Torino
On 16 January 2012, he was sold in co-ownership to Torino, returning to Serie B after playing in the top flight for three years. The fee was €1 million. He debuted 21 January against his former team, Cittadella, substituting Juan Surraco in the 71st minute. In February 2012, he scored the match-winner against Sampdoria, 2–1. On 1 May he scored a header, securing the victory for his team at Livorno. Torino was promoted to Serie A at the end of the season. On 22 June 2012, Torino bought him outright from Genoa for €600,000. On 27 January 2013, he scored a brace at the San Siro against Inter, ending 2–2. He concluded the season with 3 goals in 31 appearances.

Chievo
On 4 July 2014, he signed a two-year contract, with an option for a third, with Chievo. He scored his first goal for Chievo at home against Empoli, in the match in which he debuted with Chievo. On 8 December, he scored with a fantastic bicycle kick against Cagliari, then was decisive in a 2–1 encounter won against Sampdoria, scoring his club's second goal after a 50-metre dribbling run.

Vicenza
On 15 July 2020 he signed a 1-year contract with an option for extension with Vicenza.

Amateur levels
On 7 September 2022, Meggiorini joined amateur side San Giovanni Lupatoto.

International career
He made one appearance for the Italy U-19 team and two for the U-20.

Honours
Spezia
Coppa Italia Serie C: 2005

References

External links
 Profile at La Gazzetta dello Sport (2009–10) 
Inter Archive

Profile of Riccardo Meggiorini on Torinofc.it 

Living people
1985 births
Sportspeople from the Province of Verona
Association football forwards
Italian footballers
Italy youth international footballers
Serie A players
Serie B players
Inter Milan players
Spezia Calcio players
A.S. Cittadella players
S.S.C. Bari players
Bologna F.C. 1909 players
F.C. Pavia players
Novara F.C. players
Torino F.C. players
A.C. ChievoVerona players
L.R. Vicenza players
Footballers from Veneto